

Champions
National League: Boston Beaneaters

National League final standings

National League statistical leaders
Batting average: Willie Keeler – .385
Home runs: Jimmy Collins – 15
Runs batted in: Nap Lajoie – 127
Wins: Kid Nichols – 31
Earned run average: Clark Griffith – 1.88
Strikeouts: Cy Seymour – 239

Events
April 3 – Jack Clements, now with St. Louis, is the first southpaw to catch in 1,000 MLB games.
April 21 – Philadelphia Phillies pitcher Bill Duggleby hits a grand slam in his first major league at-bat.
April 22 – This day in baseball would see two no-hitters. First, Ted Breitenstein would throw the second no-hitter of his career, as the Cincinnati Reds would defeat the Pittsburgh Pirates, 11–0.  Meanwhile, Jay Hughes would toss a no-hitter for the Baltimore Orioles in a 5–0 win over the Boston Beaneaters. This is the first time in Major League history that two no-hitters would be thrown on the same day.  It would not happen again until Dave Stewart and Fernando Valenzuela turned the trick on June 29, .
July 5 – Lizzie Arlington becomes the first woman to play in organized baseball as she pitches for the Reading Coal Heavers of the Atlantic League. She hurled the final inning of that game and gave up two hits and a walk but did not allow a run. Some claim she also pitched in exhibition games after being hired by Ed Barrow, the league's president.
July 8 – Red Donahue tosses a no-hitter in a 5–0 Philadelphia Phillies victory over the Baltimore Orioles.
August 21 – In the second game of a doubleheader, Walter Thornton of the Chicago Orphans pitches a 2–0 no-hitter against the Brooklyn Bridegrooms.
December 1 – New York Giants president Andrew Freedman renews his team lease on the Polo Grounds for the next 10 years.

Births

January
January 5 – Riggs Stephenson
January 10 – Fats Jenkins
January 10 – Ed Stauffer
January 11 – Gene Lansing
January 12 – George Knothe
January 12 – Rip Wade
January 14 – Dick Wheeler
January 18 – John Woods
January 21 – John Mohardt
January 23 – Speed Walker
January 24 – Cliff Heathcote
January 28 – Jim Bishop
January 28 – Bill Snyder
January 29 – Dick Burrus
January 31 – Webb Schultz

February
February 1 – Bud Messenger
February 4 – Johnny Mann
February 4 – John Perrin
February 9 – Chink Taylor
February 15 – Bobby LaMotte
February 19 – Uke Clanton
February 26 – Frank Callaway
February 26 – Butch Glass
February 26 – Lee Thompson
February 28 – Jake Miller

March
March 2 – Rip Wheeler
March 5 – Bill Grevell
March 6 – Roy Hansen
March 8 – Phil Bedgood
March 10 – Frank Loftus
March 15 – Hal Kime
March 15 – Rosy Ryan
March 22 – Luke Urban
March 28 – Moses J. Yellow Horse

April
April 10 – Tom Jenkins
April 14 – Jess Doyle
April 20 – Johnny Wertz
April 22 – Tom Long
April 23 – Charlie Dorman
April 24 – Andy Cooper
April 25 – Red Thomas
April 29 – Tom Glass
April 29 – Dutch Levsen

May
May 2 – Lucas Turk
May 6 – Dewey Metivier
May 6 – Al Wingo
May 9 – George Durning
May 12 – Earl McNeely
May 18 – Harvey MacDonald
May 24 – Dennis Burns
May 26 – Milt Steengrafe
May 28 – Claude Davenport

June
June 1 – Duke Sedgwick
June 14 – Bill Doran
June 20 – Duke Shirey
June 21 – Spencer Adams
June 29 – Jimmie Long

July
July 4 – Bobby Murray
July 10 – Dick Lundy
July 11 – Joe Batchelder
July 14 – Happy Chandler
July 22 – Joe Bratcher
July 27 – Benny Bengough
July 27 – Zack Taylor
July 28 – Paul McCullough

August
August 2 – Emmett Bowles
August 7 – Oscar Levis
August 8 – John Slappey
August 14 – Bill Clowers
August 17 – Bill Pertica
August 18 – Hal Goldsmith
August 18 – Bill Knowlton
August 24 – John Monroe
August 27 – Clarence Fisher
August 27 – Frank Wayenberg
August 28 – Charlie Grimm
August 29 – Hap Collard
August 30 – Kiki Cuyler
August 31 – Sarge Connally

September
September 1 – Ed Goebel
September 9 – Frankie Frisch
September 13 – Curt Fullerton
September 16 – Al Lefevre
September 18 – George Uhle
September 20 – Chuck Dressen
September 23 – Hod Lisenbee
September 23 – George Murray
September 27 – Bill Clarkson
September 29 – Joe Matthews

October
October 4 – Frank McCue
October 7 – Joe Giard
October 9 – Joe Sewell
October 17 – Clint Blume
October 26 – Roy Moore
October 30 – Jesse Fowler
October 30 – Bill Terry

November
November 3 – Homer Summa
November 7 – Mike Pasquella
November 11 – Pie Traynor
November 14 – Claude Willoughby
November 15 – Broadway Jones
November 19 – Harry Courtney
November 20 – Tim McNamara
November 21 – Walter Zink
November 26 – John Kerr
November 29 – Red Shea
November 30 – Lou Bauer
November 30 – Firpo Marberry

December
December 1 – Charlie High
December 2 – Hal Leathers
December 4 – Doc Bass
December 14 – Maurice Archdeacon
December 16 – Dee Cousineau
December 16 – Frank Shellenback
December 17 – Red Lutz
December 17 – Oscar Tuero
December 19 – Lou Koupal
December 23 – Hinkey Haines
December 25 – Earl Kunz
December 28 – Bill Kelly

Deaths

January 28 – Ned Connor, 48, utility player for the 1871 New York Haymakers.
February 25 – Tom Power (?), first baseman.
March 29 – Tony Hellman, 36, catcher.
April 13 – Charlie McCullough, 32, pitcher.
April 14 – Jiggs Parrott, 26, infielder.
April 17 – Bobby Mathews, 46, pitcher who won 297 games, 131 of them in the National Association, in a career that ran from 1871 to 1887, including the first professional league game victory in 1871, and consecutive 30-win seasons for the Philadelphia Athletics from 1883 to 1885.
June 4 – Harry Smith, 42, infielder.
June 23 – William Rexter, 48, outfielder.
August 2 – Val Robinson, 50, outfielder.
September 21 – Bill Tierney, 40, first baseman and outfielder.
October 5 – John Richmond, 43, shortstop and center fielder for seven teams during his eight seasons from 1875 to 1885.
October 20 – Curry Foley, 42, Irish outfielder/first baseman/pitcher who played from 1879 through 1883 for the Boston Red Caps and Buffalo Bisons National League teams, and the first major league player ever to hit for the cycle (May 25, 1882).
November 21 – Bill Hague, 46, third baseman from 1875 to 1879.
November 23 – Mother Watson, 33, pitcher.
December 27 – John Sneed, 37, outfielder.
December 30 – Bill Stearns, 45, pitcher for several National Association teams from 1871 to 1875.
December 31 – Martin Duke, 31, pitcher.

References
1898 National League team stats at Baseball Reference